Aviation Regiment or Air Regiment is a type of military aviation unit, often used by the aviation corps of an army and equivalent to a Wing or Group, in most air forces.

Albania
Albanian Aviation Regiment 4020

Australia
 Australian Army Aviation
 1st Aviation Regiment (Australia)
 5th Aviation Regiment (Australia)
 6th Aviation Regiment (Australia)

Italy

Japan
 A Sentai (which is often translated as "regiment") was the basic unit of the Imperial Japanese Army Air Force.

Poland
 Polish Army
 36th Special Aviation Regiment

Russia and the Soviet Union

Russia

Soviet Union

Aviation regiment (Soviet Union)

Ukraine

United Kingdom
Army Air Corps (United Kingdom)
List of Army Air Corps aircraft units (United Kingdom)

United States

Yugoslavia

40th Fighter Aviation Regiment
81st Support Aviation Regiment
82nd Aviation Brigade, formerly 42nd Bomber Aviation Regiment and 109th Bomber Aviation Regiment
83rd Fighter Aviation Regiment, formerly 254th Fighter Aviation Regiment
88th Fighter-Bomber Aviation Regiment, formerly 43rd Bomber Aviation Regiment
94th Fighter Aviation Regiment, formerly 111th Fighter Aviation Regiment
96th Fighter-Bomber Aviation Regiment, formerly 423rd Assault Aviation Regiment 
101st Fighter-Training Aviation Regiment, formerly 2nd Training Aviation Regiment 
103rd Reconnaissance Aviation Regiment, formerly Reconnaissance Aviation Regiment 
104th Training Aviation Regiment, formerly 1st Training Aviation Regiment 
105th Fighter-Bomber Aviation Regiment, formerly 3rd Training Aviation Regiment
107th Mixed Aviation Regiment, formerly 421st Assault Aviation Regiment
111th Helicopter Regiment formerly 422nd Assault Aviation Regiment 
116th Fighter Aviation Regiment, formerly 113th Fighter Aviation Regiment
117th Fighter Aviation Regiment, formerly 112th Fighter Aviation Regiment 
119th Helicopter Brigade, formerly 1st Transport Aviation Regiment 
141st Aviation Training Regiment
150th Fighter-Bomber Aviation Regiment
184th Reconnaissance Aviation Regiment, formerly the Night Bomber Aviation Regiment and 184th Light Night Bomber Aviation Regiment
185th Fighter-Bomber Aviation Regiment
267th Aviation Regiment of School of Reserve Officers

See also

Army aviation units and formations
Air force regiments